Hyderabad City Tehsil  (Sindhi : حيدرآباد شھر تعلقو) is an administrative subdivision (tehsil) of Hyderabad District in the Sindh province of Pakistan. Hyderabad district is subdivided into 4 talukas, the Urban area around the capital Hyderabad is part of Hyderabad City Taluka.

Administration
The Taluka of Hyderabad city is administratively subdivided into 11 Union Councils.
Union Council 29 Dadanshah

History
During British rule the city of Hyderabad, Sindh became the headquarters of Hyderabad Taluka - and for a time was part of the Bombay Presidency of British India.

The Imperial Gazetteer of India, written over a century ago during British rule, describes the taluka as follows:

Demographics
At the time of the 2017 Census of Pakistan, the distribution of the population of Hyderabad City Tehsil by first language was as follows:
 67.2% Urdu
 19.8% Sindhi
 4.8% Punjabi
 2.1% Pashto
 1.3% Saraiki
 0.7% Hindko
 0.6% Balochi
 0.3% Brahui
 0.1% Kashmiri
 3.3% Others

See also
 Shiv temple, Hyderabad

References

Talukas of Sindh
Hyderabad District, Pakistan